The Melbourne Cemetery or City of Melbourne Cemetery is a cemetery in Melbourne, Florida, United States. It is located on Hibiscus Boulevard at the intersection with Lake Street.  The cemetery includes graves of original settlers of Melbourne, to include Cornthwaite John Hector who founded the city.  Although formally organized as a cemetery in 1891, native Americans purportedly used the site as a burial grounds for many years before.

Graves
 
Some of the graves include:
Beaujean family
Ellis family
Fee family
Goode family
Porcher family
Rhodes family
Rowland family

Notes

External links

Melbourne Cemetery records on Interment.net

Cemeteries in Florida
Melbourne, Florida
1891 establishments in Florida